The Ven. Arthur Charles Williams (8 July 1899 – 23 September 1974) was an Anglican priest: the Archdeacon of Bodmin from 1962 to 1969.

Williams was educated at Truro Cathedral School and served in the First World War; he was a prisoner throughout 1918.  He was ordained in 1922 after a course of study at the College of the Resurrection, Mirfield. After curacies at St Clement's, Barnsbury and St Mary, Penzance he was Vicar of Stratton from 1932 to 1939 when he became a Chaplain to the Forces. In 1945 he returned to St Mary's and served as its Vicar until his Archdeacon's appointment.

Notes

1899 births
1974 deaths
Archdeacons of Bodmin
People from Cornwall
People educated at Truro Cathedral School
Alumni of the College of the Resurrection
20th-century Church of England clergy